A social bot, or also described as a social AI or social algorithm, is a software agent that communicates autonomously on social media. The messages (e.g. tweets) it distributes can be simple and operate in groups and various configurations with partial human control (hybrid) via algorithm. Social bots can also use artificial intelligence and machine learning to express messages in more natural human dialogue.

Uses

 To influence peoples decisions, e.g.: advertise a product, support a political campaign, increase engagement statistics for social media pages, etc.
 To provide low cost customer service agent to answer questions that their users might have.
 To automatically answer  commonly asked questions on Social media such as Discord.

Lutz Finger identifies five immediate uses for social bots:
foster fame: having an arbitrary number of (unrevealed) bots as (fake) followers can help simulate real success.
spamming: having advertising bots in online chats is similar to email spam, but a lot more direct.
mischief: e.g. signing up an opponent with a lot of fake identities and spam the account or help others discover it to discredit the opponent.
public opinion bias: influence trends by countless messages of similar content with different phrasings.
limit free speech: important messages can be pushed out of sight by a deluge of automated bot messages.
to phish passwords or other personal data.

Some of another examples, such as:
Algorithmic radicalization: drive users toward progressively more extreme content over time, leading to them developing radicalized extremist political views, often generate and polarized endless media aimed to keep users engaged through preferences in media and self-confirmation.
Influence-for-hire: refers to the economy that has emerged around buying and selling influence on social media platforms.
Ghost followers: are users on social media platforms who remain inactive or do not engage in activity, but do not partake in liking, commenting, messaging, and posting.
Social influence bias: which makes users overcompensate for negative ratings but amplify positive ones.

History
Bots have coexisted with computer technology since its creation. Social bots have therefore risen in popularity simultaneously with the rise of social media. Social bots, besides being able to (re-)produce or reuse messages autonomously, also share many traits with spambots with respect to their tendency to infiltrate large user groups.

Twitterbots are already well-known examples, but corresponding autonomous agents on Facebook and elsewhere have also been observed. Nowadays, social bots are equipped with or can generate convincing internet personas that are well capable of influencing real people.

Using social bots is against the terms of service of many platforms, such as Twitter and Instagram, although it is allowed to some degree by others, such as Reddit and Discord. Even for social media platforms that restrict social bots, a certain degree of automation is of course intended by making social media APIs available. Social media platforms have also developed their own automated tools to filter out messages that come from bots, although they are not advanced enough to detect all bot messages.

The topic of a legal regulation of social bots is becoming more urgent to policy makers in many countries, however due to the difficulty of recognizing social bots and separating them from "eligible" automation via social media APIs, it is currently unclear how that can be done and also if it can be enforced. In any case, social bots are expected to play a role in future shaping of public opinion by autonomously acting as incessant and never-tiring influencer. Leading up to the present day, the impact of social bots has grown so much that they are now affecting society through social media, by manipulating public opinions (especially in a political sense, which is considered a sub-category of social bots called political bots), stock market manipulation, concealed advertisements and malicious extortion of spear-phishing attempts which is why there has been an emergence of urgency to create more research, policies, and detection of bots on the many platforms that they affect.

Detection
The first generation of bots could sometimes be distinguished from real users by their often superhuman capacities to post messages around the clock (and at massive rates). Later developments have succeeded in imprinting more "human" activity and behavioral patterns in the agent. With enough bots, it might be even possible to achieve artificial social proof. To unambiguously detect social bots as what they are, a variety of criteria must be applied together using pattern detection techniques, some of which are:
cartoon figures as user pictures
sometimes also random real user pictures are captured (identity fraud)
reposting rate
temporal patterns
sentiment expression
followers-to-friends ratio
length of user names
variability in (re)posted messages
engagement rate (like/followers rate)
Social bots are always becoming increasingly difficult to detect and understand, some of the greatest challenges for the detection of bots include: social big data, modern social bots datasets, detect the bots' human-like behavior in the wild, ever-changing behavior of the bots, lack of appropriate visualization tools and the sheer volume of bots covering every platform.

Botometer (formerly BotOrNot) is a public Web service that checks the activity of a Twitter account and gives it a score based on how likely the account is to be a bot. The system leverages over a thousand features.
An active method that worked well in detecting early spam bots was to set up honeypot accounts where obvious nonsensical content was posted and then dumbly reposted (retweeted) by bots. However, recent studies show that bots evolve quickly and detection methods have to be updated constantly, because otherwise they may get useless after a few years.

One method still in development, but showing promise is the use of Benford's Law for predicting the frequency distribution of significant leading digits to detect malicious bots online. This study was first introduced at the University of Pretoria in 2020 and had successful trials in the field.

Another method that has also proven to be quite successful in research and in the field is artificial-intelligence-driven detection which simply put, evens the playing field when putting artificial intelligence against itself. Some of the most popular sub-categories of this type of detection would be active learning loop flow, feature engineering, unsupervised learning and outliers identification, supervised learning, correlation discovery, and system adaptability.

An important mode of operation of bots is by working together in a synchronized way. For example, ISIS used Twitter to amplify its Islamic content by numerous orchestrated accounts which further pushed an item to the Hot List news, thus further amplifying the selected news to a larger audience. This mode of synchronized bots accounts is an efficient method to further spread a desired news and is also used as a modern tool of propaganda as well as stock markets manipulations.

Research and development to detect malicious bots continue to be an important topic throughout the tech world. Social media sites like Twitter, which are among the most affected with CNBC reporting up to 48 million of the 319 million users (roughly 15%) were bots in 2017, continue to fight against the spread of misinformation, scams and other harmful activities on their platforms.

Platforms

Instagram
Instagram reached a billion active monthly users in June 2018, but of those 1 billion active users it was estimated that up to 10% were being run by automated social bots. Instagram's unique platform for sharing pictures and videos makes it one of the biggest targets for malicious social bot attacks, especially porn bot accounts, because imagery resonates with the platform's users more than simple words on platforms like Twitter. While malicious propaganda posting bots are still popular, many individual users use engagement bots to propel themselves to a false virality, making them seem more popular on the app. These engagement bots can do everything from like, watch, follow, and comment on the users' posts. Around the same time that the platform achieved the 1 billion monthly user plateau, Facebook (Instagram and WhatsApp's parent company) planned to hire 10 000 to provide additional security to their platforms, this would include combatting the rising number of bots and malicious posts on the platforms. Due to increased security on the platform and enhanced detecting methods by Instagram, some botting companies are reporting issues with their services because Instagram imposes interaction limit thresholds based on past and current app usage and many payment and email platforms deny the companies access to their services, preventing potential clients from being able to purchase them.

Twitter

Twitter's bot problem is being caused by the ease of use in creating and maintaining them. To create an account you must have a phone number, email address, and CAPTCHA recognition. The ease of creating the account as and the many APIs that allow for complete automation of the accounts are leading to excessive amounts of organizations and individuals using these tools to push their own needs. CNBC claiming that about 15% of the 319 million Twitter users in 2017 were bots, the exact number is 48 million. As of July 7, 2022, Twitter is claiming that they remove 1 million spam bots on their platform each and every day. Twitter bots are not all malicious, some bots are used to automate scheduled tweets, download videos, set reminders and even send warnings of natural disasters. Those are examples of bot accounts, but Twitter's API allows for real accounts (individuals or organizations) to use certain levels of bot automation on their accounts, and even encourages the use of them to improve user experiences and interactions.

See also

Algorithmic curation
Algorithmic radicalization
Ambient awareness
Astroturfing
Asymmetric follow
Attention inequality
Chatbot
Crowd manipulation
Devumi
Doomscrolling
Doxing
Fake news website
Ghost followers
Influence-for-hire
Internet bot
Marketing and artificial intelligence
Messaging spam
On the Internet, nobody knows you're a dog
Post-truth politics
Radical trust
Review bomb
Search engine manipulation effect
Smear campaign
Social influence bias
Social media bias
Social spam
Sockpuppet (Internet)
Sybil attack
Tay (bot)
Technoself studies
Turing test
Twitter bomb
Votebot
Whispering campaign

References

External links
The Computational Propaganda Research Project University of Oxford
What is a Social Media Bot? | Social Media Bot Definition Cloudflare

Internet bots
Social media
Public relations
Social influence
Social information processing
Mass media monitoring
Internet manipulation and propaganda